Karnaphuli Gas Distribution Company Limited is a Bangladesh government owned major gas distribution company that is responsible for distributing gas in Chittagong District and the Chittagong Hill Tracts.

History
Karnaphuli Gas Distribution Company Limited was established in February 2010 by the Government of Bangladesh as a Joint Stock company. Its starting authorized capital was 30 million taka. Power production was stopped in Raozan Power Station and Shikalbaha Peaking Power Plant in 2012 due to Karnaphuli company not being able to supply adequate gas. In 2018, the company bought in the first Liquefied Natural Gas shipment in Bangladesh from Qatar and planned to distribute it in Chittagong City. In February 2019, a rupture of the company line led to three days of gas outage in Chittagong City, the second largest city of Bangladesh.

References

Organisations based in Chittagong
Government-owned companies of Bangladesh
Oil and gas companies of Bangladesh
Bangladeshi companies established in 2010